Dimitris Meidanis (born 15 June 1974) is a Greek retired football defender.

References

1974 births
Living people
Greek footballers
Levadiakos F.C. players
Panachaiki F.C. players
Egaleo F.C. players
Olympiakos Nicosia players
Aris Limassol FC players
Vyzas F.C. players
Agios Dimitrios F.C. players
Cypriot First Division players
Association football defenders
Greek expatriate footballers
Expatriate footballers in Cyprus
Greek expatriate sportspeople in Cyprus
Super League Greece players
People from Boeotia
Footballers from Central Greece